Santiago Abascal Escuza (30 October 1949 – 23 July 2017) was a Spanish politician.

Biography
Abascal was born in Amurrio, Álava. His father, Manuel Abascal Pardo, was the town's mayor during the Francoist years. With his wife Isabel Conde Álvarez, he had three children. His son Santiago Abascal Conde became the leader of Vox, while Abascal Escuza's wife, daughter and sister-in-law were all candidates for the party too.

During the Spanish transition to democracy, he joined the Spanish National Union (UNE) in 1976, which merged into the People's Alliance (AP) two years later, before becoming the People's Party (PP). He served in Amurrio Town Hall, the Juntas Generales de Álava, and in the Congress of Deputies from April 2003 to 2004. He was targeted by ETA for his political activities, facing arson, vandalism and assassination attempts; he was protected by the Civil Guard and state security.

In 2013, he was named in the Bárcenas affair. He admitted that he was given €12,000 by the PP in 1999, but could not remember who gave it to him.

Abascal later joined Vox, the party led by his son. He was their lead candidate in the 2016 Basque regional election and was hospitalised during the campaign in September, due to illness. He remained in hospital in Galdakao until his death on 23 July 2017, aged 67.

References

1949 births
2017 deaths
People from Álava
Basque politicians
People's Alliance (Spain) politicians
People's Party (Spain) politicians
Vox (political party) politicians
Members of the 7th Congress of Deputies (Spain)